Hans Christian Schmidt (born 25 August 1953 in Nustrup) is a Danish politician, who is a member of the Folketing for the Venstre political party. He is a teacher by profession, and has served as Denmark's Minister of Transport from 2010 to 2011 and again from 2015 to 2016, as well as Minister for Food, Agriculture and Fisheries from 2004 to 2007, and Minister for the Environment from 2001 to 2004. He has been a member of parliament since the 1994 Danish general election.

Background
Schmidt is the son of Holger and Ingrid Schmidt, who lived and worked on a farm. He was a school teacher in Vojens until 1984 before entering government. He is a longtime resident of the town of Vojens in Jutland.

Political career
Schmidt was first elected into parliament in the 1994 election, and has been reelected in every election since. He has been a member of the municipal council of Vojens Municipality from 1982 to 2001, and served as deputy mayor from 1998 to 2001.

References

External links

 

1953 births
Living people
People from Haderslev Municipality 
Government ministers of Denmark
Danish Ministers for the Environment
Venstre (Denmark) politicians
Members of the Folketing 1994–1998
Members of the Folketing 1998–2001
Members of the Folketing 2001–2005
Members of the Folketing 2005–2007
Members of the Folketing 2007–2011
Members of the Folketing 2011–2015
Members of the Folketing 2015–2019
Members of the Folketing 2019–2022
Members of the Folketing 2022–2026
Transport ministers of Denmark